AFS Trinity Power Corporation is an American corporation headquartered in Medina, WA with an engineering center in Livermore, CA that develops technology for plug-in hybrids. The company has developed PHEV technology that actively combines batteries with ultracapacitors. The company asserts that the combination of high-power ultracapacitors, which prefer to discharge and recharge quickly, and high-energy lithium-ion batteries, which prefer to discharge and recharge slowly, makes for a system with both long-life and high energy-density storage.

Prototype

The company also reports that its prototype "XH-150S" modified Saturn Vue SUVs demonstrated 11.6 second 0-60 performance in electric-only mode and 6.9 second 0-60 performance in full hybrid mode, which would be comparable to a Porsche Cayenne.

AFS Trinity's Extreme Hybrid prototypes have been test-driven by journalists from The New York Times, The Washington Post, ABC World News, CBS Evening News, CNN, and Salon.

History
AFS Trinity was formed on December 5, 2000, through the combination of two predecessor companies, American Flywheel Systems, Inc. (AFS), incorporated in 1991, and Trinity Flywheel Power (Trinity) which was incorporated in 1993.  Since 1991, AFS Trinity has conducted programs with private and government organizations including DARPA, NASA, the U.S. Navy, U.S. Army, U.S. DOT, California Energy Commission, Oak Ridge National Laboratories, Lawrence Livermore National Labs, Honeywell, Lockheed, and Ricardo plc.

On January 24, 2006, AFS Trinity and Ricardo signed a Technology Partnership Agreement for Ricardo to help integrate AFS Trinity's Extreme Hybrid drive train technology into passenger cars and SUVs. On January 27, 2008, the company unveiled two modified Saturn Vue SUVs (called XH-150 SUV) at the North American International Auto Show in Detroit.

On January 26, 2010, AFS Trinity demonstrated its prototypes for Delaware officials including Governor Jack Markell, suggesting that Delaware's idled factories and workforce could potentially mass-produce the vehicle.

Technology

The powertrain using two forms of energy storage is disclosed in US patent application 11/519,350.

The application describes a family of architectures where a battery is used in conjunction with a second energy storage device which may be an ultracapacitor, a flywheel, or a second battery.  The purpose of the second energy  storage device is to protect the battery from high current during high power operation.

References

External links
 

Plug-in hybrid vehicle industry